Strawbs (or The Strawbs) are an English rock band founded in 1964 as the Strawberry Hill Boys. The band started out as a bluegrass group, but eventually moved on to other styles such as folk rock and progressive rock.

They are best known for their hit "Part of the Union", which reached number two in the UK Singles Chart in February 1973, as well as for "Lay Down", a popular progressive rock hit from the same LP. Strawbs toured with Supertramp in their "Crime of the Century" tour, doing their own "Hero and Heroine" tour, which drew musical similarities and themes.

History

Early days
The Strawbs formed in 1964 as the Strawberry Hill Boys while the founder members were at St Mary's Teacher Training College, Strawberry Hill, London. The name was shortened to 'The Strawbs' for a June 1967 concert in which they wanted to display the band name on stage. Their long-time leader and most active songwriter is guitarist and singer Dave Cousins (guitar, dulcimer, banjo, vocals) (born David Joseph Hindson, 7 January 1945, Hounslow, Middlesex). In the early days Strawbs played with Sandy Denny (later lead singer of Fairport Convention and Fotheringay).

Although they started out in the 1960s as a bluegrass band, the band's repertoire shifted to favour their own (mainly Cousins') material.  While in Denmark in 1967, the Strawbs (Cousins, Tony Hooper and Ron Chesterman) with Sandy Denny recorded 13 songs for a proposed first album, All Our Own Work. It was apparently not issued in Denmark and the fledgling band could not get a UK record deal.  (Meanwhile, Denny left to join Fairport Convention and the album was forgotten until it was issued on Pickwick Hallmark in the UK in the mid-1970s.)

They were the first UK group signing to Herb Alpert's A&M Records and recorded their first single, "Oh How She Changed" in 1968, which was produced and arranged by Gus Dudgeon and Tony Visconti, who also worked on their critically acclaimed first album, Strawbs (1969). Between the first and second A&M albums, in 1969, a sampler, Strawberry Music Sampler No. 1 was recorded.  According to the 2001 CD reissue, only 99 copies of the original vinyl LP were pressed up.

After the folk-tinged Dragonfly, Cousins and Hooper added Rick Wakeman on keyboards, Richard Hudson on drums, and John Ford on bass. The new line-up had their London debut at the Queen Elizabeth Hall, where they recorded their third album, Just a Collection of Antiques and Curios; the Melody Maker reported on the concert with the headline "Tomorrow's superstar" in reference to Wakeman.  Wakeman stayed with them for one further album, From the Witchwood, then departed to join Yes, remarking to the press that "I'm sure we'll all benefit from the split because we were beginning to compromise a lot on ideas – like we'd use half of my ideas and half of theirs – and I don't think it was helping what was eventually coming out. We ended up lacking challenge. Complacency set in, and for the last couple of months we just weren't working."

He was replaced by Blue Weaver, who had previously been with Amen Corner and Fair Weather. This line-up produced what many feel to be the archetypal Strawbs album Grave New World, before yet another change, the departure of founding member Hooper, who was replaced by electric guitarist Dave Lambert, formerly of Fire and the King Earl Boogie Band.

Pop success
Lambert's arrival in 1972 coincided with a move towards a harder rock style on the next album, Bursting at the Seams. The first single from the album with Lambert on board, "Lay Down," hit the UK Singles Chart at number 12, followed by a further single from the album, "Part of the Union," which went up to number 2. The album also reached number 2 in the UK Albums Chart and the band undertook a 52-date UK tour to packed houses. The harder rock style was also evidenced by Cousins' solo album, Two Weeks Last Summer,  recorded that summer, with guests such as Roger Glover from Deep Purple and Jon Hiseman from Colosseum.

However, during the course of a US tour, tensions came to a head and the Bursting at the Seams band did just that, with Hudson and Ford splitting off to record their own material, firstly as Hudson Ford, later as The Monks and High Society. Weaver also left the band, eventually finding a gig with the Bee Gees; he also played with Mott the Hoople.

Cousins and Lambert rebuilt the band, adding John Hawken (formerly of The Nashville Teens and Renaissance) on keyboards, Rod Coombes formerly with Stealers Wheel and Chas Cronk on bass. This line-up recorded the 1974  Hero and Heroine and Ghosts, and tended to concentrate on the North American market with relatively little touring in the UK.  Strawbs still retain a great fan base today in the US and Canada. Hero And Heroine went platinum in Canada, and both albums sold extremely well in the US too.  A further album, Nomadness, recorded without Hawken, was less successful, and was their last for A&M Records.

In a review in Rolling Stone in 1974, Ken Barnes wrote:
"Strawbs moved from folkier days to a lush, stately and mellotron-dominated sound, with similarities to Yes, King Crimson and the Moody Blues. They wrote more compelling songs than the former two, and possessed more lyrical/musical substance than the latter."

Signed to the Deep Purple-owned Oyster label, they recorded two more albums with two keyboardists replacing Hawken – Robert Kirby, also known for his string arrangements (notably Nick Drake) and John Mealing of jazz-rock group If. Coombes was replaced by Tony Fernandez (known for working on Rick Wakeman's solo albums) for a further album, Deadlines, this time on the Arista label. Although recording was complete on a further album, Heartbreak Hill, featuring Andy Richards on keyboards, Cousins' decision in 1980 to leave the band to work in radio effectively signalled the band's demise, and the album remained in the vaults for many years.

Reformation
A reunion on Rick Wakeman's TV show Gas Tank in 1983 resulted in an invitation to reform to headline 1983's Cambridge Folk Festival.  The Grave New World line-up plus Brian Willoughby (who had replaced Lambert when he left in 1978 during the making of Heartbreak Hill, and had also begun a partnership with Dave Cousins as an acoustic duo from 1979 onwards) went on from there to perform occasionally in the UK, US and Europe over the next few years, replacing Weaver with Chris Parren from the Hudson Ford band and Ford himself (when he relocated to the US) with bass player Rod Demick.

1993 saw the band touring in the UK for their 25th anniversary, but the next few years proved rather quiet. Until 1998, that is, when Cousins staged a 30th anniversary bash in Chiswick Park in London, which saw several different line-ups of the band perform on a bright summer's day in the open air. The final line-up of the night – the Bursting at the Seams line-up plus Willoughby – became the ongoing version of the band, with annual tours in 1999, 2000 and 2001.

Acoustic Strawbs and beyond
An injury to Cousins' wrist coinciding with a Cousins & Willoughby commitment brought Dave Lambert in to work with Cousins & Willoughby, which soon became "Acoustic Strawbs", recording an album Baroque & Roll in 2001.  That trio began to tour on a regular basis – first in the UK, then the US and Canada, and on into Europe, the three guitars of Acoustic Strawbs effortlessly reproducing much of the majesty and depth of the "big" Strawbs keyboard-laden instrumentation.

Willoughby was replaced by Chas Cronk when Willoughby left in 2004 to spend more time working with his partner, Cathryn Craig.  Cronk has brought bass and bass pedals, which further add to the depth of the Acoustic Strawbs sound. 2004 also saw the return of the Hero And Heroine line-up of the electric band, touring in tandem with the acoustic line-up, and recording their first new album for 25 years, Deja Fou, on the Strawbs' own label, Witchwood Records.

Spin-off bands
In 1973, Hudson and Ford quit to form Hudson Ford, with the line-up of Chris Parren (keyboards), Mickey Keen (guitar and sound engineer), and Ken Laws (drums). They produced four albums, three for A&M (Nickelodeon, Free Spirit, Worlds Collide) and a fourth for CBS (Daylight). They also had hit singles with "Pick Up the Pieces" and "Burn Baby Burn", and toured extensively in the UK, US and Canada.

Switching genres in the late 70s, Hudson, Ford and Terry Cassidy combined with Clive Pearce on drums (Hudson was then playing guitar, having switched from drums) to produce the punk-flavoured 1979 album, Bad Habits, as The Monks (not to be confused with the 1960s garage/beat group of the same name). The album spawned a number 19 hit in the UK singles chart, "Nice Legs, Shame About the Face", which featured a mildly risquė cover. They dabbled with 1930s-style music in 1980 as "High Society" before returning to the pseudo-punk format of The Monks for a follow-up album released in Canada only, Suspended Animation, with the addition of Brian Willoughby on guitar and Chris Parren on keyboards.

While the album failed to produce further UK chart success, the band were huge in Canada particularly, playing stadium gigs; Suspended Animation went platinum in Canada too. The CD re-release of Suspended Animation includes six bonus tracks, recorded for a third album but never before released, by Hudson, Ford and Cassidy — Huw Gower guests on one track on lead guitar. All details of Strawbs' activity and that of ex-members can be found at their official website.

Recently

Since 2007, Strawbs have been recording and touring in two formats: the acoustic format with Cousins, Lambert and Cronk; and the entirely original Hero and Heroine/Ghosts line-up of the electric band from 1974: Cousins, Lambert, Cronk, Coombes and Hawken. The line-up undertook two tours in 2006.

For that particular recording, and other concerts on the same tour, vocalist and bass player John Ford (member of an earlier Strawbs line-up) flew over from New York to perform with members of the Hero and Heroine line-up. The Hero and Heroine line-up toured again in 2007 in the UK, including gigs at the Robin 2 (Bilston), The Stables (Wavendon), and several locations in Southern and South-Western England.  This line-up also toured the UK and US in May–June 2008. Following the end of the US Tour, John Hawken announced his intention to leave the group. The remaining four members (the Nomadness line-up) continued as the core of the electric band.  In January 2009, it was announced that Oliver Wakeman, would be playing keyboards with the band on tours of Canada, the UK and Italy.

In 2006, Strawbs released a 4-disc boxed set called A Taste of Strawbs. The Hero and Heroine/Ghosts line-up recorded a new studio album, The Broken Hearted Bride, released in September 2008.

Dave Cousins recorded a new solo album, The Boy in the Sailor Suit, with The Blue Angel Orchestra.  In 2008, he released his third solo album, Secret Paths, with steel guitarist Melvin Duffy.  Along with the album, he toured the US in Spring 2008 (joined by Ian Cutler for the early part of the tour). A concert album from this tour, entitled Duochrome, was released in September 2008.

"Lambert Cronk" also released an album in April 2007 entitled Touch the Earth, on which former Strawbs drummer Tony Fernandez and former Strawbs keyboard player  Andy Richards both play. The Strawbs' website announced that neither Rod Coombes nor Oliver Wakeman were available for the October/November 2010 tours of Canada and the UK. (Coombes has educational commitments, and Wakeman was committed to recording a new Yes album). For these tours: Tony Fernandez (who played with Strawbs on Deadlines and Heartbreak Hill) was employed on drums, and John Young on keyboards.

The November 2012 tour featured a line-up of Cousins, Lambert, Cronk, Adam Wakeman and Adam Falkner. In February 2014 the band gigged with a line-up of Cousins, Lambert, Cronk, Wakeman and Fernandez. Their album Prognostic was issued in October 2014.

In 2017, the band released The Ferryman's Curse with a line-up of Cousins, Lambert, Cronk, Fernandez and Dave Bainbridge.

The band toured the US in 2019 as part of their 50th Anniversary Celebration.  The tour included a special three day event in Lakewood, New Jersey, featuring former members along with special guests/friends appearing (Annie Haslam, Larry Fast, Tony Visconti, Wesley Stace among others).

The band released Settlement on 26 February 2021.

Members

Current members
Dave Cousins – vocals, guitar, banjo, dulcimer, autoharp 
Dave Lambert – lead guitar, acoustic guitar, vocals 
Chas Cronk – bass, acoustic guitar, vocals 
Tony Fernandez – drums, percussion 
Dave Bainbridge – keyboards, programming, guitar, bouzouki 
Acoustic Strawbs
Current members:
Dave Cousins – vocals, acoustic guitar, banjo, dulcimer 
Dave Lambert – acoustic guitar, vocals 
Chas Cronk – bass, acoustic guitar, vocals 
Former member:
Brian Willoughby – acoustic guitar

Discography

Strawbs (1969)
Dragonfly (1970)
Just a Collection of Antiques and Curios (recorded live) (1970)From the Witchwood (1971)Grave New World (1972)Bursting at the Seams (1973)All Our Own Work (1973; recorded 1967)Hero and Heroine (1974)Ghosts (1975)Nomadness (1975)Deep Cuts (1976)Burning for You (1977)Deadlines (1978)Don't Say Goodbye (1987)Ringing Down the Years (1991)Heartbreak Hill (1995)Baroque & Roll (2001)Strawberry Sampler Number 1 (2001; recorded 1969)30 Years in Rock (2001; Issued with "Wondrous Stories" magazine)Blue Angel (2003)Déjà Fou (2004)Live at Nearfest (2006)The Broken Hearted Bride (2008)Dancing to the Devil's Beat (2009)Hero & Heroine in Ascencia (2011)Prognostic (2014)The Ferryman's Curse (2017)Live in Concert CD / DVD (2020)Best of The Strawbs - Live in Concert Vinyl  (2020)Settlement (2021)

Filmography
 Grave New World (1973)
Shot on videotape and comprising videos of most of the songs from the album of the same name, this had a limited theatrical release supporting the video of Emerson, Lake & Palmer's Pictures at an Exhibition. The film, considered ahead of its time as an early music video, is paired with the Strawbs Live in Tokyo 75 DVD.
 Complete Strawbs: The Chiswick House Concert (2002)
 Strawbs Live in Tokyo 75 DVD, plus Grave New World, the movie (2003)
 Acoustic Strawbs Live in Toronto (2004)
 Acoustic Strawbs – Live At Hampton Court Palace (2009)
 Strawbs Live in Gettysburg: Rites of Spring Festival'' (2016)

References

External links

 
 

English folk musical groups
English progressive rock groups
Musical groups established in 1964
1964 establishments in England